Trimix is an injectable three-drug prescribed medication used to treat erectile dysfunction.

Overview
The active ingredients in the mixture are usually alprostadil, papaverine, and phentolamine. The injection must be compounded by a pharmacy and administered via intracavernosal injection (an injection at either side, not the base, of the penis). 

Trimix is typically compounded by a pharmacy in a sterile environment and then frozen. The compound is stable for up to six months while stored frozen and for one month if stored refrigerated beginning at the time of manufacture.

References

External links
Erectile Dysfunction Drug

Erectile dysfunction drugs
Combination drugs